The Hyderabad Civil Service (HCS), was a modern civil service system in the State of Hyderabad. In 1882 Sir Salar Jung I dismantled the old Mughal administration practices and traditions and created the Hyderabad Civil Services.

The establishment of Zilabandi system, the creation of Subedari and Taluqdari system, Revenue, Police and Judicial reforms by Salar Jung facilitated the formation of Hyderabad Civil Service. The new system was based on British administration practices. The legal framework of the Hyderabad State Services was laid by the Rules and regulations codified in 1919. The Hyderabad Civil Service, was a coveted service in the State of Hyderabad and was considered to be an elite service, and the best of the government officers were inducted into it through a competitive examination. It was abolished after the Police Action in 1948 and its Officers were absorbed into the Indian government civil services. The top officers of HCS were accommodated at Hyderabad Civil Service House located near Khairatabad and after merger in 1950 this building was converted into College of Nursing.

References

Hyderabad State
Indian Civil Service
Government of Hyderabad, India